Tonja   is a village in Setomaa Parish, Võru County in southeastern Estonia.

Setu folk singer Anne Vabarna (1877–1964) lived in Tonja village.

References

 

Villages in Võru County